William Dear (born November 30, 1943) is a Canadian actor, director, producer and screenwriter. He is known for directing the films Harry and the Hendersons, If Looks Could Kill, Angels in the Outfield, Wild America, and Santa Who?.

He also directed episodes of the television series Saturday Night Live, Television Parts, Amazing Stories, Dinosaurs, Covington Cross, and The Wannabes Starring Savvy.

Dear was born on November 30, 1943, in Toronto, Ontario. He is the father of actor and storyboard artist, Oliver Dear.

Filmography

Director
 Nymph (1973)
 Northville Cemetery Massacre (1976)
 PopClips (1980)
 Elephant Parts (1981)
 Timerider: The Adventure of Lyle Swann (1982)
 Harry and the Hendersons (1987)
 If Looks Could Kill (1991)
 Journey to the Center of the Earth (1993)
 Angels in the Outfield (1994)
 Wild America (1997)
 Balloon Farm (1999)
 Santa Who? (2000)
 School of Life (2005)
 Simon Says (2006)
 The Foursome (2006)
 The Sandlot: Heading Home (2007)
 Free Style (2008)
 The Perfect Game (2009)
 Mr. Troop Mom (2009)
 Politics of Love (2011)
 A Mile in His Shoes (2011)

Actor
 Timerider: The Adventure of Lyle Swann (1982) - 3rd Technician
 Harry and the Hendersons (1987) - Sighting Man
 Darkman (1990) - Limo Driver
 If Looks Could Kill (1991) - Bomb Tester
 Angels in the Outfield (1994) - Toronto Manager
 Midnight Stallion (2013) - Whip T. Vicker
 Razor (2017) - Bill

References

External links

1943 births
Living people
American male screenwriters
American television directors
Canadian emigrants to the United States
Fordson High School alumni
People from Dearborn, Michigan
Film directors from Toronto
Writers from Toronto
Film directors from Michigan
Screenwriters from Michigan
Fantasy film directors